Gurian may refer to:

 Gurian Republic, a short-lived (1903-1906) rebellion in Guria Province, Georgia (Caucasus)
 Ghurian, a town of 50,000 in western Afghanistan
 Gurian-e Gora, a village in Kermanshah Province, Iran
 Gurian Guitars, an instrument making company founded by luthier Michael Gurian

People with the surname
 Naomi Gurian (born 1933), a California lawyer and entertainment industry executive
 Michael Gurian, author, child development consultant and social philosopher
 Michael Gurian (born 1943), luthier, guitar manufacturer (1965-82) and musical instrument materials supplier
 Justin Gurian (born 1980), a creative genius